Acanthosaura crucigera is a species of lizard commonly known as the masked spiny lizard , Boulenger's pricklenape, or masked horned tree lizard. They are found in Myanmar, Thailand, Peninsular Malaysia, and Cambodia.

References

External links
 Flickr photo by Dave, Kaeng Krachan National Park - Thailand

Acanthosaura
Reptiles of Cambodia
Reptiles of Malaysia
Reptiles of Myanmar
Reptiles of Thailand
Reptiles described in 1885
Taxa named by George Albert Boulenger